Derek Lamont Anderson (born July 18, 1974) is an American former professional basketball player and current coach. He played eleven seasons in the National Basketball Association (NBA).

College career
Anderson is a graduate of Doss High School and was an All-Star in the state of Kentucky. Anderson played college basketball at the Ohio State University and the University of Kentucky.  In 1996, Anderson helped the University of Kentucky win the NCAA Men's Basketball Championship as part of a team that featured nine future NBA players under their coach Rick Pitino. Anderson went on to graduate from the University of Kentucky in 1997 with a degree in pharmacy.

Professional career
He was first selected by the Cleveland Cavaliers as the 13th overall pick to the 1997 NBA draft, despite missing much of his second senior season at Kentucky due to a torn anterior cruciate ligament (ACL).  He played for Cleveland from 1997 to 1999. He would be the last Cavalier to wear #23 before LeBron James. On August 4, 1999 he was traded by the Cleveland Cavaliers along with Johnny Newman to the L.A. Clippers for Lamond Murray. Anderson was ranked 7th in the NBA in free throw percentage (.877) in 1999–2000.

Anderson's NBA career was plagued by injuries.  In the 2004–2005 season he only played in 8 of the final 42 games for the Portland Trail Blazers, and missed similar numbers of games in prior seasons. On August 3, 2005, he was the first player in the league waived using the so-called "luxury tax amnesty clause" of the 2005 NBA collective bargaining agreement. He would sign with the Houston Rockets as a free agent before being traded to the Miami Heat in exchange for Gerald Fitch. The Heat would win the 2006 NBA Finals in six games after defeating the Dallas Mavericks to give Anderson his first and only championship.

Anderson was waived by Heat on September 12, 2006, prior to the beginning of the 2006–07 season. Several weeks later, on November 28, he signed with the Charlotte Bobcats; Anderson played the final two seasons of his career for the Bobcats.

Coaching career 
In January 2023, Anderson will coach the Costa Rica national team in the United Cup of Champions season.

NBA career statistics

Regular season

|-
| align="left" | 1997–98
| align="left" | Cleveland
| 66 || 13 || 27.9 || .408 || .202 || .873 || 2.8 || 3.4 || 1.3 || .2 || 11.7
|-
| align="left" | 1998–99
| align="left" | Cleveland
| 38 || 13 || 25.7 || .398 || .304 || .836 || 2.9 || 3.8 || 1.3 || .1 || 10.8
|-
| align="left" | 1999–00
| align="left" | L.A. Clippers
| 64 || 58 || 34.4 || .438 || .309 || .877 || 4.0 || 3.4 || 1.4 || .2 || 16.9
|-
| align="left" | 2000–01
| align="left" | San Antonio
| 82 || 82 || 34.9 || .416 || .399 || .851 || 4.4 || 3.7 || 1.5 || .2 || 15.5
|-
| align="left" | 2001–02
| align="left" | Portland
| 70 || 27 || 26.6 || .404 || .373 || .856 || 2.7 || 3.1 || 1.0 || .1 || 10.8
|-
| align="left" | 2002–03
| align="left" | Portland
| 76 || 76 || 33.6 || .427 || .350 || .859 || 3.5 || 4.3 || 1.2 || .2 || 13.9
|-
| align="left" | 2003–04
| align="left" | Portland
| 51 || 46 || 35.5 || .376 || .305 || .824 || 3.6 || 4.5 || 1.3 || .1 || 13.6
|-
| align="left" | 2004–05
| align="left" | Portland
| 47 || 32 || 26.4 || .389 || .384 || .805 || 2.7 || 3.0 || .8 || .1 || 9.2
|-
| align="left" | 2005–06
| align="left" | Houston
| 20 || 8 || 29.1 || .393 || .284 || .836 || 4.2 || 2.7 || .8 || .2 || 10.8
|-
|style="text-align:left;background:#afe6ba;"| 2005–06†
| align="left" | Miami
| 23 || 3 || 20.2 || .308 || .313 || .842 || 2.6 || 2.1 || .3 || .1 || 5.8
|-
| align="left" | 2006–07
| align="left" | Charlotte
| 50 || 32 || 23.8 || .429 || .355 || .877 || 2.3 || 2.7 || 1.0 || .1 || 8.0
|-
| align="left" | 2007–08
| align="left" | Charlotte
| 28 || 0 || 14.1 || .376 || .365 || .737 || 1.9 || 1.6 || .4 || .0 || 5.0
|- class="sortbottom"
| style="text-align:center;" colspan="2"| Career
| 615 || 390 || 29.2 || .408 || .341 || .853 || 3.2 || 3.4 || 1.1 || .1 || 12.0

Playoffs

|-
| align="left" | 1998
| align="left" | Cleveland
| 4 || 0 || 25.8 || .455 || .000 || .885 || 2.3 || 2.8 || 1.3 || .3 || 10.8
|-
| align="left" | 2001
| align="left" | San Antonio
| 7 || 7 || 27.7 || .262 || .273 || .762 || 2.7 || 2.4 || .4 || .0 || 7.7
|-
| align="left" | 2002
| align="left" | Portland
| 3 || 0 || 25.3 || .433 || .333 || .889 || 2.3 || 2.3 || .7 || .0 || 14.7
|-
| align="left" | 2003
| align="left" | Portland
| 2 || 2 || 11.0 || .250 || .000 || .000 || .5 || .0 || .0 || .0 || 1.0
|-
|style="text-align:left;background:#afe6ba;"| 2006†
| align="left" | Miami
| 8 || 0 || 8.3 || .300 || .357 || .875 || 1.1 || .6 || .3 || .0 || 3.0
|- class="sortbottom"
| style="text-align:center;" colspan="2"| Career
| 24 || 9 || 19.2 || .336 || .302 || .838 || 1.9 || 1.7 || .5 || .0 || 7.0

References

 Questions about state hall of fame selection process, Bob Watkins, The Spencer Magnet

External links

ESPN.com – Derek Anderson

 Derek Anderson page on BigBlueHistory.net

1974 births
Living people
American men's basketball players
Basketball players from Louisville, Kentucky
Charlotte Bobcats players
Cleveland Cavaliers draft picks
Cleveland Cavaliers players
Doss High School alumni
Houston Rockets players
Kentucky Wildcats men's basketball players
Los Angeles Clippers players
Miami Heat players
Ohio State Buckeyes men's basketball players
Portland Trail Blazers players
San Antonio Spurs players
Shooting guards